may refer to:

 Avec le temps (EP), an extended play record by French singer-songwriter Isleym
 "Avec le temps" (Isleym song), a song from the extended play
 "Avec le temps" (Léo Ferré song), by French poet and musician Léo Ferré
 Avec le temps, an album by Soso Maness, 2021